David Lemieux may refer to:

David Lemieux (archivist) (born 1970), Canadian audio and film archivist
David Lemieux (boxer) (born 1988), Canadian boxer